Together Under One Sun (Macedonian language: Заедно под едно Сонце)  was the slogan for celebrating the 20th anniversary of the Independence of the Republic of Macedonia. 
The Government of Macedonia organized this spectacle.

Program 
A military parade, including the Macedonian army, police and special units, passed in front of the Parliament of Macedonia. It was followed by the placement of the declaration of independence of Macedonia in the Macedonian Struggle and the Internal Macedonian Revolutionary Organization (IMRO) Museum. A small theatrical performance followed, before the president placed the declaration.

Prime Minister Nikola Gruevski opened the biggest monument in the Balkans Warrior on horseback. It was followed by fireworks and performance of Macedonian songs.

Media 
There was much criticism from media in other Balkan countries. Only the Greek media was silent for this event.

Legacy 
This was the first celebration of Macedonian Independence that reached an audience of nearly 200 000.

References

References 

History of Macedonia (region)